William Clarence Braisted (9 October 1864 – 17 January 1941) was an American surgeon. He was born in Toledo, Ohio, died at home in West Chester, Pennsylvania, and is buried at Arlington National Cemetery. He graduated from the University of Michigan in 1883 and with Doctor of Medicine degree from the Columbia University College of Physicians and Surgeons in 1886. He was the Surgeon General of the United States Navy from 1914 to 1920 and the president of the American Medical Association from 1920 to 1921.

References

External links
 
 

1864 births
1941 deaths
American surgeons
Physicians from Ohio
Surgeons General of the United States Navy
Presidents of the American Medical Association
University of Michigan alumni